Parole Racket is a 1936 American crime film, directed by Charles C. Coleman and released by Columbia Pictures. It stars Paul Kelly, Rosalind Keith, Thurston Hall.

References

External links
Parole Racket at the Internet Movie Database

1936 films
American crime films
1936 crime films
Films directed by Charles C. Coleman
American black-and-white films
Columbia Pictures films
1930s American films
1930s English-language films
English-language crime films